Mallochohelea is a genus of biting midges in the family Ceratopogonidae. There are at least 40 described species in Mallochohelea.

Species
These 48 species belong to the genus Mallochohelea:

 Mallochohelea aenipes (Macfie, 1940) c g
 Mallochohelea albibasis (Malloch, 1915) i c g b
 Mallochohelea albiclava (Kieffer, 1921) c g
 Mallochohelea albihalter Wirth, 1962 i c g
 Mallochohelea alpina (Clastrier, 1962) c g
 Mallochohelea aspera Debenham, 1974 c g
 Mallochohelea atripes Wirth, 1962 i c g b
 Mallochohelea aukurabis Meillon & Wirth, 1983 c g
 Mallochohelea australiensis (Lee, 1948) c
 Mallochohelea boettcheri (Edwards, 1929) c g
 Mallochohelea caudellii (Coquillett, 1905) i c g
 Mallochohelea errinae (Meillon, 1940) c g
 Mallochohelea flavidula (Malloch, 1914) i c g
 Mallochohelea fluminea Meillon & Wirth, 1981 c g
 Mallochohelea hamata Meillon & Wirth, 1987 c g
 Mallochohelea hansfordi Meillon & Wirth, 1983 c g
 Mallochohelea hardyi (Tokunaga, 1966) c
 Mallochohelea inermis (Kieffer, 1909) c g
 Mallochohelea kirki (Macfie, 1939) c g
 Mallochohelea limitrofe Spinelli & Felippe-Bauer, 1990 c g
 Mallochohelea luaboensis (Meillon, 1959) c g
 Mallochohelea munda (Loew, 1864) c g
 Mallochohelea nemoralis (Macfie, 1940) c g
 Mallochohelea nigripes (Macfie, 1939) c g
 Mallochohelea nitida (Macquart, 1826) c g
 Mallochohelea prominens (Johannsen, 1931) c g
 Mallochohelea pullata (Wirth, 1952) i c g
 Mallochohelea remota (Kieffer, 1919) c g
 Mallochohelea sabroskyi (Tokunaga, 1959) c g
 Mallochohelea satelles Debenham, 1974 c g
 Mallochohelea scandinaviae (Clastrier, 1962) c g
 Mallochohelea senex Debenham, 1974 c g
 Mallochohelea setigera (Loew, 1864) c g
 Mallochohelea shibayai (Tokunaga, 1940) c g
 Mallochohelea sidis (Meillon, 1959) c g
 Mallochohelea silvicola (Goetghebuer, 1920) c g
 Mallochohelea siricis (Meillon, 1961) c g
 Mallochohelea smithi (Lewis, 1956) i c g
 Mallochohelea spinipes Wirth, 1962 i c g
 Mallochohelea stygia Debenham, 1974 c g
 Mallochohelea sybleae (Wirth, 1952) i c g
 Mallochohelea texensis Wirth, 1962 i c g
 Mallochohelea tianshanica Remm, 1980 c g
 Mallochohelea tumidicornis Debenham, 1974 c g
 Mallochohelea turneri (Ingram & Macfie, 1923) c
 Mallochohelea unca Meillon & Wirth, 1987 c g
 Mallochohelea variegata Wirth, 1962 i c g
 Mallochohelea vernalis Remm, 1965 c g

Data sources: i = ITIS, c = Catalogue of Life, g = GBIF, b = Bugguide.net

References

Further reading

 
 
 

Ceratopogonidae
Articles created by Qbugbot
Chironomoidea genera